Isabelle Kaiser (2 October 1866, in Beckenried – 17 February 1925, in Beckenried) was a Swiss writer who produced works in the French and German languages. She received the prize of the French Academy.

Works

French

Poetry

French poems:
Ici-Bas (1888)
Sous les étoiles (“Under the stars,” 1890)
Des ailes (1897)
Le jardin clos (1912)

Novels and stories
Other works in French:
Cœur de femme (“Heart of a woman,”1891)
Sorcière (1895)
Héro (1898)
Notre père qui êtes aux cieux (“Our father who is in heaven,” 1899)
Vive le roi! (“Long live the king!,” 1903)
L'Eclair dans la voile (1907)
Marcienne de Fluë (1909)

German
Her works in German include:
Wenn die Sonne untergeht (“When the sun sets,” 1901), a novel
Mein Herz (“My heart,” 1908), poems
Die Friedensucherin (“A woman searching for peace,” 1908), a romance
Der wandernde See (1910)
Von ewiger Liebe (“On eternal love,” 1913)

Notes

References

External links 
 
 

1866 births
1925 deaths
Swiss women poets
Swiss women novelists
Swiss poets in French
Swiss poets in German
19th-century Swiss writers
19th-century Swiss poets
19th-century Swiss novelists
19th-century Swiss women writers
20th-century Swiss poets
20th-century Swiss novelists
20th-century Swiss women writers
20th-century Swiss writers
People from Nidwalden